Velilla de San Esteban is a village in Soria, Spain. It is part of the municipality of San Esteban de Gormaz. The village had 37 inhabitants in 2000 and just 10 in 2017.

References

Populated places in the Province of Soria
Towns in Spain